Imagination Is the Only Escape is an unreleased video game by Luc Bernard. It was developed for the Nintendo DS, though it has been suggested it would have been a WiiWare game instead. Bernard has since expressed interest in bringing the title to Wii U.

Set in France during World War II, Imagination Is The Only Escape is an educational title aiming to teach children about The Holocaust.

Story
The story starts off before the Occupation of France by Nazi Germany. The player is introduced to the main character, a Jewish boy named Samuel who is playing with his friends, going to school, and living a normal life in Paris. However, when France is invaded by the Nazis, Samuel and his family are soon forced to move to a ghetto and wear the yellow star of David on their clothes.

The scene changes to the Vel' d'Hiv Roundup, the mass arrest of Jews in Paris that took place on July 16, 1942. During the chaos Samuel's mother tells him to escape the city. She takes off his star so he cannot be recognized as a Jew, and gives him the address of a Catholic priest who can help him escape Paris and the occupied part of France. As Samuel escapes, his mother is spotted and taken away.

Samuel starts his journey to find the priest, sneaking his way through Paris. Samuel finds him, and is smuggled out to southern France. They arrive at a small village hidden in a forest, where the villagers are passing off Jewish children from all over France as Christian orphans, and Samuel meets a fox who tells him that if he helps him he will be able to see his mother again.

Development
In 2013, Bernard started an Indiegogo drive for Imagination Is the Only Escape. It did not reach its goal, and whether or not the game will eventually be made is unknown.

Controversy
Imagination has courted controversy for its dark setting and subject matter, though some outlets have applauded the game for approaching such a delicate subject.

Nintendo of America has stated that they have no plans to release the game. Bernard claims that the company is afraid of the game's subject matter, but believes Nintendo of Europe will not block its release.

References

Europe-exclusive video games
Nintendo DS games
Platform games
Video games developed in France
Video games set in France
WiiWare games
The Holocaust in popular culture
World War II video games
Vaporware video games